The Ministry for Reconstruction (or Ministry of Housing and Reconstruction) was a government department of Greece founded after World War II.

The ministry is now defunct.

List of Ministers for Reconstruction 

There was also a Ministry of Reconstruction for Eastern Macedonia during World War I preceding the above Greek ministry.

See also
 Cabinet of Greece

Reconstruction
Reconstruction